Jack Leewood (1913–2004) was an American producer and director. He worked at Allied Artists then for Robert L. Lippert for a number of years.

Select credits
Thundering Jets (1958) – producer
The Alligator People (1959) – producer
13 Fighting Men (1960) – producer
Thunder Island (1963) – producer, director

References

External links

American film producers
1913 births
2004 deaths